Ophir is a small settlement in Central Otago, New Zealand, located between Alexandra and Ranfurly close to the east bank of the Manuherikia River. The settlement of Omakau is located on the opposite bank,  to the northwest.

Ophir was originally known as Blacks, when gold was discovered in Central Otago in 1863 Ophir's population grew to over 1000 as it became the commercial and social centre of the district. It was renamed Ophir at this time which was where King Solomon obtained the gold to sheath the Temple in Jerusalem, and is thus the place name of the legendary "King Solomon's Goldmines".

Today, with a current population of around 50, the town is also known for the many original buildings still surviving including the restored Post and Telegraph Office, the 1895 Courthouse, and the 1870s Police Station. The Post Office is a schist and stone masonry structure built in 1886, and registered by Heritage New Zealand as a Category I Historic Place (List number 341, 22 November 1984).

New Zealand's second-lowest official temperature of -21.6 °C was recorded at Ophir on 3 July 1995, even though it is not located at a high elevation.

Demographics
Ophir is considered by Statistics New Zealand to be a part of the Omakau rural settlement, which is itself part of the much larger Manuherikia-Ida Valleys statistical area.

References 

Populated places in Otago